Survive Said The Prophet, also known as Sabapro and abbreviated SSTP, is a Japanese rock band formed in Tokyo in 2011. They are incorporated under the Sony Music Records label, and are most well known for the hit 2019 single Mukanjyo, the 1st opening of the Vinland Saga anime.

Biography 
In 2011, the group was formed in Tokyo with members other than Gt. Shige and Ba. Junya after the dissolution of the predecessor band YesterdayFall with the limited release of the single "Let Us Party". It was followed in 2012 by "EP". By 2014, they released singles of "MeIaM" and "Cocoon" limited to 1000 copies each. They Participated in the split "Redline Riot" consisting of four bands, Crystal Lake, Noisemaker, and Wrong City, which was released exclusively at Tower Records.

By 2015, they released "Course of Action" for the first time nationwide distribution from his own label. Vo.Yosh participated in the vocal project of popular playwright Hiroyuki Sawano. Meanwhile, Gt.Takuya Suzuki withdrew. In 2016, the band made a contract with Zestone Records with Gt.Tatsuya joining. It appeared in "Knotfest2016". They released their second album Fixed with Chris Crummett as producer. It ranked 3rd in the "Breakthrough Artist" category chosen by readers of AP Japan magazine.

In 2017, at the final of the "Fixed" tour, a one-man show at Tsutaya O-West was sold out. It appeared in "Punkspring 2017" and "Sommer Sonic 2017" and Teamed up with Chris Crummett again to release the 3rd album Wabi Sabi. It appeared at "Countdown Japan 17/18" in December. By 2018 in May, double A-side single "Ne:One / Hi Lo" (Anyone / High and Low) was released. In August, the single "found & lost" was released while In September, they released the fourth album space [s] (Spaces) from Sony Music Records and made a major debut. From October to February of the following year, the space Tour 2018-19 was held with 27 performances in 26 cities. In December, the single "Red" was released. The band then appeared on "Countdown Japan 18/19".

In 2019, the 47-prefecture Now More Than Ever Tour took place from March to June. In August, the single "Mukanjyo" was released. The "Made in Asia Tour" was held from September to December, including performances at Zepp Divercity Tokyo. The tour final was held at Shinkiba Studio Coast. In 2020 they released their fifth album Inside Your Head. In October, to commemorate the 10th anniversary of their formation, the members looked back on their 10 years, selecting 10 songs that they felt symbolised themselves as a band, and five songs selected based on fan votes. A total of 20 songs, including their top five popular songs, were compiled as the best-of album To Redefine / To Be Defined and released on January 20, 2021.

Later in 2021, Ba/Vo.Yudai departed from the band, and Dr. Show appeared as El Tempo at the closing ceremony of the 2020 Tokyo 2020 Paralympics.

Members

Yosh (Yoshi, Yoshiya Morita, born 1988 June 4), Vocalist
Ex.Yesterday Fall
Born in Tokyo.
 Disliked foods are shiitake mushrooms and eggplants.
He went to international school. After graduating, he attended Full Sail University in the United States.
Uses Shure microphones.
When he was a student, he was in the wrestling club and was also the president of the student council.
Tatsuya (Tatsuya Kato, born 1989 July 11), Guitarist
 Ex.FAKE FACE
 Born in Taihaku Ward, Sendai City, Miyagi Prefecture.
married. He is the father of one child.
Using a Schecter guitar. His model is SCHECTER AR-06 See Thru Black.
His hobbies are skateboarding, fishing, and muscle training.
He has two cats (Maru & Pek).
Yudai and he have known each other since elementary school.
Ivan (Ivan, Ivan Kwong 1988 October 25-), Guitarist
 Ex. Aphelion
From Hong Kong. Supper Moment's vocalist, Sunny Chan, is a childhood friend, and when he was in Hong Kong, he performed live on the street with Sunny. In 2018, Survive Said The Prophet and Supper Moment co-produced the song "To Whom," and the two reunited for the first time in about a decade.
 He came to Japan when he was 19 years old.
He is fluent in Japanese, English, Cantonese and Mandarin.
In 2018, he organized a strike in Iran with his continued dissatisfaction with the Iranian government.
married, and the father of 1 child.
 Uses Ibanez guitar. His model is Ibanez AZ224F-BIG etc.
 He is also in charge of product sales and designing CD jackets.
'Show (Sho Okada, born 1989 November 21) Drummer
 Ex. RAVAR Ex. fly sleep fly
 Member of El Tempo
 Born in Machida City, Tokyo.
In RAVAR, he was in charge of the leader.
Experienced in karate and became a black belt in 5th grade.
 Endorsement contracts with Pearl and Sabian.
Meet drummania and start playing drums.
 Good friends with katsuma from coldrain.
Since Yudai left the group, he has also served as a scream part.

Former members 

Takuya Suzuki – Guitar (Ex.YesterdayFall Ex.Moonwalk Street)
 In 2015, withdrew within the year.
Kei Tatsuno – Drums (Ex.YesterdayFall)
 Yudai' - Bass&Scream (Ex.Underland)
Withdrawal on April 2, 2021.

 Former support members Yokochin – Support drums (Ex.ANGRY FROG REBIRTH)Yuki Hanazawa – Support bassist and dirty vocal
 Currently active in me;us.Atsushi' – Support bassist
 Currently active in chasedown.

One-man live / Sponsored event

Tie-up

Performance event 
 May 4, 2013 - GOLD RUSH2013
May 19 - ROOKiEZ is PUNK'D presents BUMPONdaSTYLE vol.22 ～MIXTURE IS NOT DEAD～break of dawn tour FINAL (ROOKiEZ is PUNK'D)
November 15-CLUBDROP×audioleaf×MAG SYSTEM presents【TRANSIT】vol'2-
August 20, 2014 - FACES TOUR 2014 (FAKE FACE)
October 3.4 - coldrain "Until The End JAPAN TOUR 2014" (coldrain)
October 26, 28, 31 - girugamesh 2014-2015 tour "gravitation" (girugamesh)
December 9 - Daylight Tree Bounenkai 2014 Day:1
January 10, 12, 16, 18, 23, 25, 27, 2015 - REDLINE RIOT TOUR 2015 (CRYSTAL LAKE, NOISEMAKER, Survive Said The Prophet, wrong city)
February 14 - THE BROTHERHOOD TOUR 2015
March 10 - SWANKY DANK 『Magna Carta』 Tour (SWANKY DANK)
March 11 - MASTER PEACE'15
March 14 - TENJIN ONTAQ Tenjin Ototaku
March 20 - MONSTER ENERGY OUTBURN TOUR 2015

References

External links
Official website

Japanese musical groups